Anneli Marita Olsson (later Johansson; born 8 June 1952) is a Swedish sprinter. She competed in the women's 4 × 100 metres relay at the 1972 Summer Olympics. Her team was disqualified for dropping the batton.

References

External links
 

1952 births
Living people
Athletes (track and field) at the 1972 Summer Olympics
Swedish female sprinters
Olympic athletes of Sweden
Athletes from Gothenburg
Olympic female sprinters